Interface (also known as The Electrochemical Society Interface) is a quarterly open access scientific journal published by the Electrochemical Society covering developments in electrochemistry and solid-state chemistry, as well as news and information about and for members of the society.

History 
The journal was established in 1992, because the Journal of the Electrochemical Society became a purely technical publication. The new publication was intended to provide members with information on matters affecting their society interests. The first issue was published in the Winter of 1992, with a cover that featured Nobel Laureate Rudolph Marcus, who learned of his winning the prize while at the ECS fall meeting in Toronto.

Indexing and abstracting
The journal is indexed and abstracted in the following bibliographic databases:

References

External links 
 

Electrochemistry journals
Academic journals published by learned and professional societies
Quarterly journals
English-language journals
Publications established in 1992
Electrochemical Society academic journals